The Rocky Valley Lutheran Church in Dooley, Montana was built in January 1915.  It was listed on the National Register of Historic Places in 1993. It has also been known as Dooley Lutheran Church.

In 1993, it was the only surviving historic major building in the Dooley townsite area. On July 8, 2019, the historic church collapsed due to a storm.

References

Churches on the National Register of Historic Places in Montana
Churches completed in 1915
National Register of Historic Places in Sheridan County, Montana
1915 establishments in Montana
Lutheran churches in Montana